Evi Kratzer (born January 24, 1961, in Arvigo) is a former Swiss cross-country skier who competed from 1982 to 1989. She earned a bronze medal in the 5 km at the 1987 FIS Nordic World Ski Championships in Oberstdorf.

Kratzer's best individual finish at the Winter Olympics was 8th in the 20 km at Sarajevo in 1984. Her only individual victory was at a 10 km event in Calgary in 1987.

Cross-country skiing results
All results are sourced from the International Ski Federation (FIS).

Olympic Games

World Championships
 1 medal – (1 bronze)

World Cup

Season standings

Individual podiums
1 victory 
4 podiums 

Note:  Until the 1999 World Championships, World Championship races were included in the World Cup scoring system.

References

External links

Women's 4 x 5 km cross-country relay Olympic results: 1976-2002 

1961 births
Living people
Cross-country skiers at the 1980 Winter Olympics
Cross-country skiers at the 1984 Winter Olympics
Cross-country skiers at the 1988 Winter Olympics
Swiss female cross-country skiers
FIS Nordic World Ski Championships medalists in cross-country skiing
Olympic cross-country skiers of Switzerland
People from Moesa District
Sportspeople from Graubünden
20th-century Swiss women